Exes & Ohs is an American  and Canadian cable TV series that was launched on Logo on October 8, 2007, and Showcase in Canada. The show centres on the dating life of Jennifer (Michelle Paradise), a lesbian documentary filmmaker with a vivid fantasy life and a floundering career. Jennifer is looking for Ms. Right but must navigate the rules of lesbian dating life, most of which she learns the hard way. Her friends are there to help: Sam (Marnie Alton), a sexy commitment-phobe who flips women faster than real estate; Chris (Megan Cavanagh) and Kris (Angela Featherstone), a lesbian couple expanding both their pet accessory business and their family; and Crutch (Heather Matarazzo), a young musician who wants to be taken seriously but still has some growing up to do.

The series is based on the short film The Ten Rules: A Lesbian Survival Guide, created and written by Michelle Paradise, and directed by Lee Friedlander. It is shot in Vancouver, British Columbia, Canada, but is set in Seattle.

The show's second season was pushed back various times. AfterEllen.com stated that it would not premiere until 2010. It was later set to premiere on June 29, 2011.

Cast

Main
Michelle Paradise as Jennifer
Marnie Alton as Sam
Megan Cavanagh as Chris
Angela Featherstone as Kris
Heather Matarazzo as Crutch
Jennifer Spence as Devin

Recurring 
Chelah Horsdal as Lauren Brooks
Darby Stanchfield as Sienna
Amy Dudgeon as Emmy Beever
Stacy Grant as Elizabeth

Guest stars 
Sheryl Lee Ralph as Rev Ruby
Sonja Bennett as Kate
Karen Holness as Corrine
Linnea Sharple as Charlie
Cathy DeBuono as Becca

Season 1

Season 2

References

External links
 Exes & Ohs en Lesbicanarias Resumen de episodios, noticias, imágenes.
 

Logo TV original programming
2000s Canadian LGBT-related comedy television series
Showcase (Canadian TV channel) original programming
2007 Canadian television series debuts
2000s Canadian sitcoms
English-language television shows
Lesbian-related television shows
Television shows filmed in Vancouver
Canadian LGBT-related sitcoms